Lost Illusions may refer to:

Illusions perdues, serial novel published by Honoré de Balzac between 1837 and 1843
Lost Illusions (painting), 1865 painting by Charles Gleyre
Lost Illusions (1911 film), directed by Edwin S. Porter
Elveszett illúziók, 1983 film directed by Gyula Gazdag
Lost Illusions (ballet), 2011 ballet by Leonid Desyatnikov
Lost Illusions (2021 film), directed by Xavier Giannoli

See also
The Lost Illusion, alternate title for the 1948 film The Fallen Idol